The 1950 Sudbury municipal election was held on December 4, 1950, as voters in Sudbury, Ontario, and its outlying communities voted to elect mayors, alderman, school trustees, the hydro commissioner and the reeve of McKim Township.  In addition the voters were asked to decide on three propositions, whether to allow Sunday sport, ash collection and a two-year term for municipal elections.

At this time the city was divided into three wards; Fournier, McCormick and Ryan.  Three aldermen were elected for each ward.  They were selected by choosing the top three contestants with the highest number of recorded ballots (i.e those contestants who place first, second and third).

The municipal election of 1950 represented the start of a key shift in the demographic of city council.  It was in this election that citizens of Sudbury elected two women to serve as alderman for the first time in the city’s history. They were Grace Hartman, who would later become the city's first woman mayor, and Dr. Faustina Kelly Cook.

On an interesting side note, William S. Beaton, the incumbent, ran against Peter Fenton, the mayor of Sudbury from 1930 to 1932.

Results

The results are taken from the December 5, 1950, edition of the Sudbury Daily Star.

References

1950
1950 elections in Canada
1950 Ontario municipal elections